Let My Puppets Come (also called Let My Puppets Go) is a 1976 softcore pornographic comedy film written and directed by Gerard Damiano, and starring Al Goldstein, Lynette Sheldon, Penny Nichols and Damiano. All the sex scenes are between puppets or puppets on human.

Background
While Damiano may have been more noted for the Caballero studios' project Deep Throat, he created Let My Puppets Come using both human and puppet actors, and was perhaps the first of its kind in the United States.  The title was intended as a parody of the 1976 Broadway musical Let My People Come and the film was released the same year as the first airing of the television series The Muppet Show, being referred to as "a sexy muppet movie".

Plot
Owing a mob boss half a million dollars which must be paid in 24 hours, a group of executives comes up with ideas for, and films, a pornographic movie.

Cast
 Luis De Jesus as Mr. Big (as Little Louis) 
 Gerard Damiano   
 Al Goldstein   
 Viju Krem  
 Penny Nicholls
 Lynette Sheldon

Reception
Robert Firsching of Allmovie called the film "light-hearted", noting that the director "uses the novelty of a cast consisting mostly of Muppet-style marionettes". While remarking that the plot is a standard one of producers trying to create a film that will bring attention to their studio, he concludes that "Damiano keeps the style breezy and charming enough that the film is unlikely to offend many potential viewers".

See also
 Adult puppeteering

References

External links
 
 

1976 films
1970s pornographic films
Puppet films
Films directed by Gerard Damiano
Muppet parodies
1970s English-language films